Little Regret Peak is an  mountain summit located in Custer County, Idaho, United States.

Description
Little Regret Peak is part of the Lost River Range which is a subset of the Rocky Mountains. The mountain is set on land managed by Salmon–Challis National Forest. Neighbors include No Regret Peak one mile south, line parent Mount Breitenbach, 1.75 mile south-southeast, Mount Corruption two miles north, Leatherman Peak three miles to the west, and Borah Peak, the highest peak in Idaho, is seven miles to the northwest. Precipitation runoff from the mountain's slopes drains to Pahsimeroi River.

Climate
Based on the Köppen climate classification, Little Regret Peak is located in an alpine subarctic climate zone with long, cold, snowy winters, and cool to warm summers. Winter temperatures can drop below −10 °F with wind chill factors below −30 °F.

See also
 List of mountain peaks of Idaho

References

External links
 Little Regret Peak: Idaho: A Climbing Guide

Mountains of Idaho
Mountains of Custer County, Idaho
North American 3000 m summits
Salmon-Challis National Forest